Sakela is one of the main festival of Kirat Rai people, an ethnic group indigenous to Eastern Nepal and Sikkim, Kalimpong, and Darjeeling regions of India. Sakela is celebrated twice a year and is distinguished by two names Ubhauli and Udhauli. Sakela Ubhauli is celebrated during Baisakh Purnima (full moon day in the month of Baisakh) and Sakela Udhauli is celebrated during the full moon day in the month of Mangsir.

Significance
Kirats believe in shamanism and are worshippers of nature. The Sakela celebration is a prayer to mother nature for healthy crops and protection from natural calamities. The festival is Started on Baisakh Purnima, Sakela Ubhauli is celebrated for 15 days in Baisakh (April/May) marking the beginning of the farming year. Similarly, the celebration of Sakela Udhauli during Mangsir (November/December), which is the harvest season, is the giving of thanks to mother nature for providing a good harvest.

Sakela dance
The main characteristic of this festival is a ritual dance call Sakela dance performed by large groups of Kirats, wearing their traditional attire. People from all ages dance together in a large circle. There are male and female leaders in each circle known as Silimangpa and Silimangma respectively. They choreograph the dance moves known as sili while others follow them. The sili reflects the different aspects of human life and their relationship with nature.

Variations 
Among Kirats, Sunuwar and Rai celebrate this festival, whereas the Yakkhas and the Limbus have their own Youchyang and Chasok Tangnam. Despite important local variations, indigenists view these dances as specific as well as common to all Kirat. There are different nomenclatures of Sakela in different Khambu languages. The Chamling sub-tribe calls it Sakela. Bantawas call it Sakewa or Sakenwa while the Thulungs call it Toshi.

Gallery

See also 

 Kirat Mundhum
 Kirat Region

References

External links

 United Kirat Rai Organization of America

Kiranti
Kirat festivals
May observances
Public holidays in Nepal
Nepalese culture
Observances set by the Vikram Samvat calendar
Culture of Koshi Province